Indian Electrical and Electronics Manufacturers' Association (IEEMA) is an Indian non-governmental trade association and advocacy group focused on manufacturing of electrical, electronics and allied equipment. IEEMA maintains the dialogue with the government of India, its departments, electric utilities, users, standardisation bodies, educational institutions, research, development and testing agencies. Mr. Vipul Ray is the president of IEEMA for the year 2021-2022, while Mr. Rohit Pathak and Mr. Hamza Arsiwala are the two Vice Presidents.  Ms. Charu Mathur is the Director General of IEEMA.

IEEMA works with standardisation bodies, R&D organisations, testing institutes, other apex industry bodies, autonomous institutions, trade bodies and sectoral & regional associations.

Export promotion
IEEMA organizes delegation visits and participation in exhibitions abroad for the promotion of export of its members.
Activities of IEEMA
Interactive session of IEEMA
International Events participation of IEEMA
IEEMA IBD Meetings
MoU Partners of IEEMA
Participation at International Event
Participation on Hannover Messe, Germany
Participation in Africa Utility Week, Cape Town S Africa
Participation in 5th International Istanbul Smart Grids and Cities Congress and Fair, Istanbul, Turkey
Participation in Middle East Electricity Dubai

Publications

Information circulars
Through its circulars, it circulates information about procedural and policy changes made by the Government in taxation, import-export policy, industrial regulations as well as tender information, business opportunities, production and import-export statistics, standards and other matters of interest to the industry.

IEEMA Journal is a publication of IEEMA which covers technical and techno-commercial articles, industry information, statistics, business opportunities, IEEMA activities etc. IEEMA Journal is the leading electrical & electronics monthly published by IEEMA since June 1981, covering articles of techno-commercial importance, national and international news related to power sector. It is the only trade journal certified by Audit Bureau of Circulation (ABC), with the circulation of 10,000 copies every month.

Directory of members
A directory of members, IEEMA Directory containing information about its members and the industry.

Events

ELECRAMA 
ELECRAMA  is a biennial exhibition for power, electrical, and industrial electronics and allied products organized by IEEMA. It is one of the largest international exhibition of electrical and industrial electronics industry in the world.

IEEMA training programs
IEEMA organizes training programs catering to the needs of the Indian industry.

Notable people 

 R.N. Mukhija, past president of IEEMA

See also
MIOS -  Meter Inter Operability Solution

References

External links
 

1948 establishments in India
Trade associations based in India
Chambers of commerce in India
Ministry of Micro, Small and Medium Enterprises
Non-profit organisations based in India
Organisations based in Delhi
Organizations established in 1948
Technology trade associations
Electronics industry in India